Decisive Analytics Corporation (DAC) is an American defense analytics provider which was bought by Whitney, Bradley and Brown, Inc. (WBB) in 2020. The company was founded in 1996. DAC headquarters is located in Arlington, Virginia. Clients include United States Intelligence Community, Missile Defense Agency, United States Department of Defense and commercial customers.

Products and services 

Decisive Analytics Corporation provides analytical products and services to the Department of Defense and the United States intelligence community. This includes systems engineering, life-cycle logistics, cybersecurity, data analytics and machine learning.

Published works, conference papers, and patents
 C W Misner, J van Meter, D Fiske. Numerical relativity beyond I+. Gravitation and astrophysics: On the occasion of the 90th year of general relativity: Proceedings of the VII Asia-Pacific International Conference : National Central University, Taiwan, 23–26 November 2005.
 

 D Fanjoy, D Pederson.  Solving variations of the assignment problem with a genetic algorithm. Military Operations Research Society Symposium.  June 2007

Awards 
Washingtonian Magazine Great Places to Work (2013, 2011, 2009, 2007)
 Washington Business Journal Best Places to Work (2013, 2011, 2009)
 National Tibbetts Award SBIR Program Success (2007)
 Greater Washington Government Contractor Awards: Small Contractor of the Year Nominee (2005)
 Arlington County Chamber of Commerce Tech-e Corporate Citizen of the Year (2005)
 Virginia Chamber of Commerce Fantastic 50 (2006)
 Inc. (magazine) 5000 List (2009 and 2005)
 Deloitte Technology Fast 50: Virginia (2007, 2006, 2005, and 2004)
 Deloitte Fast 500 (2006, 2005, and 2004)
 CRN Magazine VAR 500 List (2010, 2009 and 2008)

References

External links 
 Decisive Analytics Corporation 

Organizations established in 1996
Defense companies of the United States
Engineering companies of the United States